The 2023 Southern Conference baseball season was the baseball season for the Southern Conference as part of the 2023 NCAA Division I baseball season.  was predicted to win the conference in the preseason poll. The conference tournament is scheduled for May 24–28 at Fluor Field at the West End in Greenville, South Carolina.

Regular Season 
The Southern Conference begins their conference play on March 24. Each team will play 21 conference games.

Standings

Results

Tournament 

The 2023 Southern Conference baseball tournament is scheduled to be held from May 24 through May 28 at Fluor Field at the West End in Greenville, South Carolina. The winner of the conference tournament will receive an automatic bid to the 2023 NCAA Division I baseball tournament.

All eight teams will participate in the tournament, with the bottom four seeds playing a single-elimination play-in round.  The remaining teams will then play a six-team double-elimination tournament, with the top two seeds receiving a bye and playing first round winners.

Bracket

Conference leaders

See also 
 2022 in baseball

References 

 
Southern Conference
Southern Conference baseball seasons